During the 2007–08 English football season, Sheffield Wednesday F.C. competed in the Football League Championship.

Season summary
In the 2007–08 season, the Owls made their worst ever start to a season, losing six league games in a row. Chairman Dave Allen resigned in November 2007, and Wednesday avoided relegation with a win on the last day of the season.

Final league table

Results
Sheffield Wednesday's score comes first

Legend

Football League Championship

FA Cup

League Cup

Squad

Left club during season

References

Sheffield Wednesday F.C. seasons
Sheffield Wednesday F.C.